Society Girl is a 1932 American pre-Code film directed by Sidney Lanfield and starring James Dunn, Peggy Shannon and Spencer Tracy.  The film presents a rare supporting role for Tracy, momentarily at the nadir of his career with Fox Film Corporation, who plays Briscoe, a boxer's frustrated manager. The picture was produced by William Fox, photographed by George Barnes, and edited by Margaret Clancey.

Cast
James Dunn as Johnny Malone
Peggy Shannon as Judy Gelett 
Spencer Tracy as Briscoe 
Walter Byron as Warburton 
Bert Hanlon as Curly
Marjorie Gateson as Alice Converse 
Eula Guy as Miss Halloway

External links
 

1932 films
Films directed by Sidney Lanfield
1932 drama films
American drama films
Films produced by William Fox
American black-and-white films
Fox Film films
1930s American films
1930s English-language films